Looks That Kill is a 2020 American dark romantic comedy  written and directed by Kellen Moore. The film stars Brandon Flynn, Julia Goldani Telles, Peter Scolari (In his final film role before his death in 2021) and Ki Hong Lee.

The film was released digitally on June 19, 2020.

Plot
The story is of sixteen-year-old Max, who has a strange condition: a face so angelic it can be lethal. He is constantly alone until he meets Alex, a girl with her own bizarre ailment who aids him on his quest of self-destruction, without accidentally killing anyone by showing his  face.
Alex suffers from a rare heart disease that causes her heart to grow if she feels any emotion (happiness-anger-sorrow-jealousy), because it can't process them. 
 
The two meet after he accidentally kills his latest therapist with his face. Max wants to jump off a bridge to kill himself, but Alex talks him out of it by saying, "You jump, I'll jump." He pursues her, and goes back to the bus stop they had used previously.

They have an adventure of young love, with Alex even taking him to a place she has never showed anyone else; the retirement home she volunteers at. One friend of hers who resides at the home, Esther, is writing a novel of her descent into Alzheimer's.

Their romance begins to weaken after they crash his best friends school dance, where Alex begins to have some issues. While she’s in the bathroom some bullies tear Max's mask off and kill his best friend's latest girlfriend.

He gets arrested but is bailed out, and goes to see Alex in the hospital. There he learns there was never actually a chance of her becoming better and the medicine she was supposed to be taking halted emotions but since she started to fall for him she was willingly to risk her life to feel them so she stopped taking them. She then asks him to kill her by letting her see his face. He freaks out and leaves, only going back once she is close to dying. He finally lets her see his face, which doesn’t actually kill her. He realizes that unconditional love means his face isn’t lethal, she instead dies of natural causes.

To honor her, he visits the nursing home and helps their friend write her novel and finally he takes a bag of green jellybellies and tosses them over the bridge they first met at he walks away knowing what he'll do with his life. He becomes an angel of death, granting euthanasia to all who request it so they can look at his face and die happily and peacefully.

Cast
Brandon Flynn as Max Richardson
 Julia Goldani Telles as Alex
 Ki Hong Lee as Dan
 Annie Mumolo as Jan Richardson
 Peter Scolari as Paul Richardson
 Priscilla Lopez as Mary
 Monique Kim as Yu Shen
 Susan Berger as Rosemary
 Linsday Mushett as Tiffany
 Tom Proctor as Dr. Vin

Production
In March 2018, Brandon Flynn, Julia Goldani Telles and Ki Hong Lee were cast in leads roles in the film, with a directorial debut from Kellen Moore, who also penned the screenplay.

Release
In April 2020, it was announced Gravitas Ventures had acquired distribution rights to the film, setting a June 19 digital release for the film amid the COVID-19 pandemic. It was made available through video on demand platforms, including Amazon and iTunes.

Reception

Critical response
Liz Braun of AWFJ.org wrote "Looks That Kill begins as a dark comedy, evolves into a romantic teen fable, and suddenly veers off into euthanasia territory. Kind of a tone whiplash situation, but a YA audience will probably find lots to like regardless." Lisa Payne of RedCarpetCrash.com said the film had "an interesting premise that didn't really go anywhere". Gwen Ihnat of The A.V. Club called it "a quirky take on the teen ailment drama".

References

External links
 
 

2020 films
American black comedy films
2020 romantic comedy films
2020 black comedy films
American romantic comedy films
Magic realism films
2020s English-language films
2020s American films